Raybon Brothers were an American country music duo from Sanford, Florida, consisting of brothers Marty Raybon and Tim Raybon. Prior to the duo's inception in 1997, Marty Raybon was the lead singer of the country music band Shenandoah, having left in 1997, before rejoining in 2014.

The Raybon Brothers charted in 1997 with a cover of Bob Carlisle's pop hit "Butterfly Kisses". Their version was a top 40 hit on both the Billboard country music charts and the Billboard Hot 100. A second single, "The Way She's Lookin'", reached the lower regions of the country charts. Marty recorded a number of solo projects before rejoining Shenandoah.

Discography

Studio albums

Singles

Music videos

References

Country music groups from Florida
Country music duos
Sibling musical duos
MCA Records artists
Musical groups established in 1997
Musical groups disestablished in 1997